Masataka (written: 昌孝, 雅孝, 雅隆, 正隆, 正孝, 正崇, 正太, 正貴, 正尚, 政孝, 仁崇, 將貴, 昌隆, 真孝 or 真隆) is a masculine Japanese given name. Notable people with the name include:

, Japanese voice actor
, Japanese shogi player
, Japanese rebel
, Japanese footballer and manager
, Japanese announcer, singer and writer
, Japanese diplomat
, Japanese actor
, Japanese musician, composer and singer-songwriter
, Japanese rugby union player
, Japanese table tennis player
, Japanese physician
, Japanese baseball player and manager
, Japanese chemist
, Japanese footballer
, Japanese chief executive
, Japanese shogi player
Masataka Takayama (disambiguation), multiple people
, Japanese businessman
, Japanese footballer
, Japanese racing driver
, Japanese baseball player

Fictional characters
, a character in the manga series Tenjho Tenge
Commander Masataka Shima, an IJN officer and the main antagonist of Medal of Honor: Rising Sun

Japanese masculine given names